The concept of cognitive justice is based on the recognition of the plurality of knowledge and expresses the right of the different forms of knowledge to co-exist. 

Indian scholar Shiv Visvanathan coined the term cognitive justice in his 1997 book "A Carnival for Science: Essays on science, technology and development". Commenting on the destructive impact of hegemonic Western science on developing countries and non-Western cultures, Visvanathan calls for the recognition of alternative sciences or non-Western forms of knowledge. He argues that different knowledges are connected with different livelihoods and lifestyles and should therefore be treated equally.

Cognitive justice is a critique on the dominant paradigm of modern science and promotes the recognition of alternative paradigms or alternative sciences by facilitating and enabling dialogue between, often incommensurable, knowledges. These dialogues of knowledge are perceived as contributing to a more sustainable, equitable, and democratic world. 

The call for cognitive justice is found in a growing variety of fields, such as ethnobiology, technology and database design, and in information and communication technology for development (ICT4D).

South-African scholar and UNESCO education expert Catherine Odora Hoppers wrote about cognitive justice in the field of education. She argued that indigenous knowledges have to be included in the dialogues of knowledge without having to fit in the structures and standards of Western knowledge. When Indigenous knowledges are treated equally, they can play their role in making a more democratic and dialogical science, which remains connected to the livelihoods and survival of all cultures.

See also
 Decolonization of knowledge
 Sociology of absences

References

Further reading
 
 
 
 

Knowledge